The 1880 United States presidential election in Florida took place on November 2, 1880, as part of the 1880 United States presidential election. Florida voters chose four representatives, or electors, to the Electoral College, who voted for president and vice president.

Florida was won by General Winfield Scott Hancock (D–Pennsylvania), running with former Representative William Hayden English, with 54.17% of the popular vote, against Representative James Garfield (R-Ohio), running with the 10th chairman of the New York State Republican Executive Committee Chester A. Arthur, with 41.05% of the vote.

Results

See also 

 1880 United States House of Representatives elections in Florida
 1880 Florida gubernatorial election

References 

Florida
1880
1880 Florida elections